Den Hoorn is a village in the southwest of the Netherlands, near the town Delft. On 1 January 2017, population counted 8041 people.

There are three primary schools in Den Hoorn. Every August they have the Varend Corso (translated: Floating Corso).

External links
Den Hoorn on Midden-Delfland.net
Den Hoorn en Midden-Delfland Mooi Dichtbij portal

Populated places in South Holland
Midden-Delfland